Rational expression may refer to:
A mathematical expression that may be rewritten to a rational fraction, an algebraic fraction such that both the numerator and the denominator are polynomials.
A regular expression, also known as rational expression, used in formal language theory (computer science)

See also  
 rational number
 rational (disambiguation)